The Blaireau Case may refer to:

 The Blaireau Case (1923 film), a 1923 French silent film 
 The Blaireau Case (1932 film), a 1932 French comedy drama film

See also
 Adieu Blaireau, a 1985 French film